Wayne Morris (1914–1959) was an American film and television actor.

Wayne Morris may also refer to:

Wayne Morris (Australian footballer) (born 1947), played with South Melbourne in VFL
Wayne Morris (American football) (born 1954), running back with Cardinals and Chargers
Wayne Morris (English actor) (born 1964), stage name since 2000 has been Adam Morris

See also
Wayne Morse (1900–1974), United States senator from Oregon